PMC Club Athletico Faisalabad was a professional football club based in Faisalabad, Punjab, Pakistan. Originally known as Punjab Medical College Football Club for its association with Punjab Medical College, the name was changed after club had a 50% share takeover by Zenith Sports in July 2008 before the start of the 2008–09 Pakistan Premier League season.

History
The club was founded in Faisalabad as an independent team. They teamed up with Punjab Medical College, making use of their home stadium and becoming Punjab Medical College Football Club or PMC F.C. for short. They were largely anonymous in Pakistan club football until they won promotion from the Pakistan Football Federation League to Pakistan Premier League in 2007.

However, they found life difficult in the Pakistan Premier League in which they suffered heavy defeats. In their first 10 games they only picked up one point, but a 2-0 home win against the equally struggling Wohaib FC  gave the team its first win the PPL. The team still struggled until the second half of the season where they improved to the point they closed in on 13th placed Pakistan Railways and safety. On the final fixture of the season, they needed to win against Pakistan Navy, having a game in hand over Railwaymen. PMC FC beat Navy 2-1 at home, allowing them to stay in the PPL for another season.

Between the end of the 2007-08 season and the start of the 2008 season saw great change at the club. A group called Zenith Sports with CEO Malik Riaz Hai Naveed took a 50% stake in the club. Zenith Sports at earlier planned to start a club in the Geo Super league, but with the league cancelled, they decided to invest in a PPL club instead.

They renamed the club PMC Club Athletico Faisalabad, a name heavily influenced by Spanish football. The new name and background changes failed to improve the club's fortunes. After a good start, Athletico faltered and quickly found themselves hovering around the relegation zone. Their fortunes changes in the second half of the season, and they clawed their way up the table, ending the season as 7th placed.

Final players

External links
FootballPakistan.Com (FPDC)

Football clubs in Pakistan
Sport in Faisalabad
1990 establishments in Pakistan
Association football clubs established in 1990
Football in Faisalabad